Holcoglossum quasipinifolium is a species of plant in the family Orchidaceae. It is found in China and Taiwan.

References

External links
 

quasipinifolium
Endangered plants
Orchids of China
Orchids of Taiwan
Taxonomy articles created by Polbot